The anti-nuclear logo "Nuclear Power? No Thanks" (Danish: "Atomkraft? Nej tak."), also known as the "Smiling Sun," is the international symbol of the anti-nuclear movement. This logo has been ubiquitous worldwide since the late 1970s and the 1980s. BBC News reported in 2005 that few symbols had become "as instantly recognizable across the world." Even the nuclear power industry recognized the logo's "power and success," the BBC report said. Over 20 million Smiling Sun badges were produced in 45 national and regional languages, such as Danish, Korean, Swedish, English, Arabic, Hebrew, Norwegian, and Russian. In recent years the logo has been playing a prominent role once again to raise awareness and funding for anti-nuclear groups, especially in Germany, Austria and Switzerland where opposition is growing to plans for extending the operation of old nuclear reactors and constructing new ones.

Anne Lund, Activist and Designer

The Smiling Sun logo was designed in 1975 by Danish activist and designer Anne Lund who was part of the Danish organization OOA (/ Organization for Information on Nuclear Power). At the time of creating the Smiling Sun she had no prior design experience. However, the logo was trademarked in 1977. By posing the question: "Nuclear Power?" and providing a concise answer, "No Thanks," the logo was intended to express dissent and—by questioning nuclear power—to stimulate dialogue. 
The house where Anne Lund designed the original symbol can still be seen in Klostergade 6-8, Aarhus, Denmark.
In 2011, after the Fukushima disaster, a new version was released for renewable energy, with the statement "Renewable Energy? Yes Please" (Danish: "Vedvarende Energi? Ja tak!") on a green background with a yellow sun.

Smiling Sun Mural in Aarhus, Denmark

In 1983, a mural of the Smiling Sun was painted near the crossing of Vestergade and Emil Vetts Passage, in the city of Aarhus, Denmark, near the location where it was originally designed by Anne Lund. However, in 2008, it was almost destroyed because of real estate developments in the area, but there were protests by its admirers and they succeed in keeping this urban mural intact. More recently, it was restored.

Trademark

The Smiling Sun logo is an internationally registered trademark. The purpose of the trademark is to protect the logo against alteration and prevent use by commercial and partisan political interests. Anti-nuclear groups may apply for user rights to the OOA Fund in Denmark. An online shop sells Smiling Sun merchandise in 50 different languages. The Italian political parties Federation of Green Lists, Federation of the Greens and Green Europe have licensed use of the symbol for their party electoral materials and logos.

Nuclear Power? Yes Please 

A network of pro-Nuclear physicists, software developers, and environmental activists drawing inspiration from the original "Nuclear Power? No Thanks" image, but that viewed Nuclear power as part of a sustainable and green-friendly energy option into the 21st century, devised an image similar to—but with a pro-nuclear energy connotation—as part of an ongoing effort that originated in 2008.

Some commentators in support of the "Nuclear Power? Yes Please" movement have made arguments that nuclear power should be regulated and safely conducted, but not outright banned, arguing that "The overwhelming priority for those who make decisions about energy must be to avert climate breakdown. They need to keep the lights on, but not by sacrificing the future welfare of humanity and Earth’s living systems. It is better to light a candle than to curse the darkness. It is also better to curse the darkness than to burn your house down."

Additional pro-nuclear power environmentalist commentators have supported the "Nuclear Power? Yes Please" messaging as, "...part of a comprehensive post-carbon energy..."

Gallery

See also 

 Anti-nuclear movement
 Renewable energy debate

References

External links 

Anti-nuclear movement
Political symbols